is a Japanese manga created by Hiroshi Koenji and Go Nagai. The manga was originally serialized in the magazine Monthly Shōnen Jump by Shueisha. It is a parody of Maboroshi Tantei, just as Kekko Kamen is a parody of Gekko Kamen. And as a Kekko Kamen, the main heroine is almost nude (mostly topless), using panties as a mask. Her secret identity is the student Susumi Fuji. She decides to take the identity of Maboroshi Panty in order to help her father solve mysterious crimes.

Two direct-to-video live-action films based in the manga have been created, Bishōjo Tantei Maboroshi Panty (美少女探偵 まぼろしパンティ) in 1991 and Maboroshi Panty VS Henchin Pokoider in 2004, which was also based in another of Go Nagai's manga, Henchin Pokoider.

Characters
 Maboroshi Panty (まぼろしパンティ)
Susumi's superhero alter-ego. Cutting two eyeholes in a pair of one of her panties, Susumi wears it as a mask, and dresses in only a scarf, gloves, boots, and underwear, she battles the sinister forces lurking in her school. Despite her martial arts knowledge, Maboroshi Panty's lack of experience sometimes leads her to make mistakes. She is also not above killing her adversaries, such as shooting a villain dead after he unmasks her.

 Susumi Fuji (藤寿々美)
The beautiful and innocent teenage daughter of the local Chief of Police. A bright girl at the top of her class, Susumi is concerned about the crime rate at her school. Possessing a strong sense of justice, Susumi makes it her goal to rid her school of its criminals.

 Inspector Fuji (藤 警部)
Susumi's widowed father, and the local Police Department's Chief Inspector. Inspector Fuji finds it difficult dealing with the area's high crime rate. Eventually, he receives help from the masked superhero, Maboroshi Panty, not knowing that she's his daughter, Susumi! However, he eventually does find out her identity, and this allows father and daughter to collaborate on their respective cases.

 Tsutomu Yagyu (柳生つとむ)
A handsome male classmate of Susumi's, Tsutomu is also opposed to the new Principal's vile practices as well. After Maboroshi Panty rescues him from the clutches of the enemy, Tsutomu repeatedly assists her when she runs into danger.

 Toenail of Satan (サタンの足の爪)
In volume 3 of the manga, when the crime rate at Susumi's school continues to escalate, the administrators bring in Kekko Kamen's fiendish enemy, the villainous Toenail of Satan, to take over as the new Principal of the school. With him, the masked demon brings his usual team of sadistic teachers and humiliating punishments. Maboroshi Panty then seeks to put an end to the villain's method of education.

Cast
Miyuki Katori as Maboroshi Panty
Misa Nakajo
Dengeki Network (Tokyo Shock Boys)
Suzumi Hanai
Rinako Fujitani
Mayumi Satoi
Pichi Pichi Gals

External links
 Maboroshi Panty at The World of Go Nagai webpage.
 Maboroshi treasure mansion
 Illusion Panty at D/visual.
Maboroshi Panti (1991 film) at Superheroes Lives website
Bishojo Tantei Maboroshi Panty  at allcinema
Bishojo Tantei Maboroshi Panty  at the Japanese Movie Database

1981 manga
1991 films
Japanese sex comedy films
Go Nagai
Shōnen manga